Foucherans may refer to:
Foucherans, Doubs, a commune in the French region of Franche-Comté
Foucherans, Jura, a commune in the French region of Franche-Comté